Panagiotis Mavrikos (born on 2 May 1974) was a Greek newspaper publisher. He was notable for being the publisher of the newspaper Akropoli.

Death
On 9 June 2016, Mavrikos mysteriously died from a fire inside his Porsche.  The fire originated from the gearbox, according to the experts that examined the remains of the car, discovering additionally a hole on the bottom of the cabin. Eventually the case closed in February 2018 without finding any criminal evidence, but attributed the break-up of the gearbox and the ensuing fire to poor maintenance.

References

 

Greek newspaper publishers (people)
1974 births
2016 deaths